The Martha's Vineyard AVA is an American Viticultural Area located in Dukes County, Massachusetts, including all of the land on the islands named Martha's Vineyard and Chappaquiddick Island.  These two islands are located off the southern Massachusetts coast, surrounded by Vineyard Sound, Nantucket Sound, and the Atlantic Ocean.  The creation of the AVA in 1985 was controversial.  Objections were lodged by the proprietors of a vineyard in California also named Martha's Vineyard, who felt that the creation of an AVA with the same name would dilute their brand value.  Federal regulators ruled in favor of the AVA, citing historical evidence that viticulture has been practiced on the Massachusetts island named Martha's Vineyard since at least 1602.  The maritime location helps to create a slightly warmer climate than the nearby coastal regions of Massachusetts, and a growing season that is almost three weeks longer. The hardiness zone is 7a.

References 

American Viticultural Areas
Geography of Dukes County, Massachusetts
Geography of Martha's Vineyard
Massachusetts wine
1985 establishments in Massachusetts